Both of the New Mexico incumbents were re-elected.

See also 
 List of United States representatives from New Mexico
 United States House of Representatives elections, 1972

1972
New Mexico
1972 New Mexico elections